Dehideniya is a village in Sri Lanka. It is located within Central Province.

History
Dehideniya's first settler was Dehideniya Bandara of Godapola, according to Archibald Campbell Lawrie's 1896 gazetteer of the province.

Demographics

See also
List of towns in Central Province, Sri Lanka

References

External links

Populated places in Central Province, Sri Lanka